Amingada is a village in the southern state of Karnataka, India. It is located in Manvi taluk of Raichur district in Karnataka.

References

Villages in Raichur district